École des beaux-arts de Montréal (The School of Fine Arts in Montreal; EBAM) was an educational institution founded in Quebec in 1922. The Saint-Jean-Baptiste Society was instrumental in its creation. Its former Sherbrooke Street building now houses the Office québécois de la langue française.

Faculty of the school include Edwin Holgate as well as Academy Award-winning animator and painter Frédéric Back, who taught there briefly prior to joining Radio-Canada.

The building was completed in 1922 as the Commercial & Technical High School, designed by Montreal architect Jean-Omer Marchand, and is located at 3450 Saint Urbain Street (at Sherbrooke Street) in Montreal.

In 1969, the school was incorporated into the Faculty of the Arts of the University of Quebec at Montreal.

Notable alumni

Jean L Auger
Micheline Beauchemin 
Paul-Émile Borduas 
Ghitta Caiserman-Roth 
John Alton Collins
Jacques Drouin 
Pierre Granche 
Sylvia Lefkovitz
Enid Legros-Wise
Jean Paul Lemieux
Anna McGarrigle (1964-1968) 
Anne Isabelle McQuire (1921-2006)
Guido Molinari 
Claude Roussel 
Armand Vaillancourt

References

External links

Art schools in Canada
Defunct art schools
Schools in Montreal
Université du Québec à Montréal
Educational institutions established in 1922
Educational institutions disestablished in 1969
1922 establishments in Quebec
Quebec government buildings
Le Plateau-Mont-Royal